The 1980 "A Song For Europe" contest was held on 26 March 1980 (the same day as that year's budget), at the BBC Television Theatre in Shepherd's Bush and was hosted by a dinner-suited Terry Wogan. The BBC Concert Orchestra under the direction of John Coleman as conductor accompanied all the songs, but all the music was pre-recorded. The theme music was "Te deum" the Eurovision theme.

Before Eurovision

A Song for Europe 1980
12 songs were chosen by the Music Publisher's Association.

Following his second place in the 1979 contest, songwriter Richard Gillinson was asked to submit a song to replace the disqualified entry "Tell Me" by The New Seekers, which was eliminated two weeks before the final after the group began promoting the track before the contest. Gillinson's song "Surrender" was performed by the same artist who presented his 1979 song, Kim Clark. The lead vocal of "Tell Me" was taken by New Seeker Nicola Kerr, who had been one of the 'Plus Two' who had finished 3rd for Ireland in the Eurovision Song Contest 1977.

The twelve songs were voted on by 14 regional juries, who awarded 1-12 points to each song. Each of the 11 jurors awarded 1-5 points to each song, the total scores being added up, with the song earning the most points being awarded 12 points, the second placed song earned 11, the third 10 and so on, down to 1 point for the song with the fewest votes.

The jury spokesperson could be seen on screen awarding the votes, sometimes with the jury members in vision. These were broadcast from the BBC's 14 regional news studios.

Owing to a tie break and with the live show quickly running out of time, a clearly flustered Terry Wogan, unsure of what to do in this unprecedented circumstance, returned to the 14 juries who were hastily asked to pick their favourite between songs two and five. Some juries ignored their previous voting and switched allegiance to Prima Donna who won by eight votes to six.

UK Discography 
Scramble - Don't Throw Your Love Away: WEA K18206.
Maggie Moone - Happy Everything: GTO GT270.
Plain Sailing - Easy: Chrysalis CHS2386.
Sonja Jones - Here We'll Stay: Magnet MAG165.
Frida - Here We'll Stay: Epic A3435 (1983).
Prima Donna - Love Enough for Two: Ariola ARO221. 
Jacqui Scott - Symphony for You: CBS SCBS8330.
Duke & The Aces - Love is Alive: Epic SEPC8505.
Roy Winston - Everything's All Right: RCA PB5242. 
Midnite - Love Comes, Love Grows: GEM GEMS24. 
The Main Event - Gonna Do My Best: Carrere CAR146.
Pussyfoot - I Want to Be Me: EMI EMI5045.
Kim Clark - Surrender: CBS SCBS8524.
The New Seekers - Tell Me: EMI EMI5050.

At Eurovision 
At the Eurovision itself, "Love Enough for Two" scored 106 points and was positioned third overall. The event took place in The Hague in the Netherlands and was won by Ireland's "What's Another Year?" by Johnny Logan.

Terry Wogan provided the BBC television commentary, whilst Steve Jones provided the BBC Radio 2 commentary. Regular Eurovision radio commentator Ray Moore served as spokesperson for the UK jury. This was the start for Wogan's continuous television commentary which he would do every year until 2008.

Voting

References 

1980
Countries in the Eurovision Song Contest 1980
Eurovision
Eurovision